Gideon's Army is a 2013 American documentary film about three public defenders in the Southern United States. The movie is directed by Dawn Porter. Its title comes from Gideon v. Wainwright, which required that indigent criminal defendants be offered counsel at trial. The film received the Ridenhour Documentary Film Prize in 2014, as well as the Candescent Award at the 2013 Sundance Film Festival.

References

External links

Documentary films about law in the United States
Documentary films about African Americans
2013 films
2013 documentary films
HBO documentary films
2010s American films